The Vancouver Balloholics were a Canadian semi-professional basketball team. They started play in the 2014–15 season as a member of the American Basketball Association (ABA). They played in the league's Pacific Northwest Division. The Balloholics played their home games at the British Columbia Institute of Technology BCIT Gymnasium in Burnaby, British Columbia. In 2017 the team became a Training League for Youth Basketball for Victory Sports Camps and training Youth for U11, U12, U15 and U17 Leagues at High Schools and Elementary Schools around Burnaby, British Columbia.

External links
 Official website

Sport in Burnaby
Defunct American Basketball Association (2000–present) teams
Basketball teams in British Columbia
Basketball teams established in 2014
2014 establishments in British Columbia